Adriano Bausola (22 December 1930 – 28 April 2000) was an Italian philosopher and academic.

Biography
Bausola was rector of Università Cattolica del Sacro Cuore.
Among other tasks and functions is:
Member of the National Academy of Lincei in philosophical sciences category;
Member of the Institute Lombardo – Academy of Sciences and Letters;
Board member of the Italian Philosophical Society;
Vice President of the Organizing and Scientific Committee of the Social Weeks of Italian Catholics from 1985 to 1994;
Consultant to the Sacred Congregation for Catholic Education;
Chairman of Committees of the Church's evangelization and human promotion conference in Rome from 30 October to 4 November 1976;
Moderator of one of the five fields of Reconciliation Christian Church Conference and the human community in Loreto 9 to 13 April 1985;
Auditor to the Extraordinary Synod of Bishops called by the Pope for the 20th anniversary of Vatican II;

Honour 
 : Knight Grand Cross of the Order of Merit of the Italian Republic (2 june 1988)

References 

1930 births
2000 deaths
20th-century Italian  philosophers
People from Ovada
Knights Grand Cross of the Order of Merit of the Italian Republic